The 1990 NCAA Division I Men's Golf Championships were contested at the 52nd annual NCAA-sanctioned golf tournament for determining the individual and team national champions of men's collegiate golf at the Division I level in the United States.

The tournament was held at the Innisbrook Island Course in Tarpon Springs, Florida.

Arizona State won the team championship, the Sun Devils' first NCAA title.

Future professional, five-time major winner, and defending NCAA champion Phil Mickelson, from also from Arizona State, won the individual title, his second of three.

Individual results

Individual champion
 Phil Mickelson, Arizona State (279)

Team results

Finalists

DC = Defending champions
Debut appearance

References

NCAA Men's Golf Championship
Golf in Florida
NCAA Golf Championship
NCAA Golf Championship
NCAA Golf Championship